Pallerla is a village in Yadadri district in Telangana, India. It falls under Atmakur mandal.

References

Villages in Yadadri Bhuvanagiri district